is a retired Japanese professional sumo wrestler from Kita-ku, Niigata. He made his professional debut at sandanme tsukedashi, which allowed him to skip the lower divisions, in March 2016, and his first makuuchi division honbasho was the Natsu tournament in May 2017. His highest rank was maegashira 1.

Early life and sumo background
Oyanagi started doing sumo his first year of elementary school. He abandoned sumo in junior high school in favor of baseball and continued until entering high school. He started to feel he was reaching his limit in baseball and in high school because of his size he went back to participating in sumo. After a fairly successful high school career he chose to continue doing sumo at Tokyo University of Agriculture where he majored in forestry in the Faculty of Regional Environmental Science. Each spring in Osaka the members of the Tokyo University of Agriculture sumo club would have joint training with the members of Tokitsukaze stable. This is where he was introduced to Tokitsukaze-oyakata who was also a Tokyo University of Agriculture graduate. He was later told by him that he should join professional sumo, which he accepted.

Career

Early career

Oyanagi won no major titles in his amateur career, being somewhat prone to lapses in concentration and overconfidence against some of his key rivals. However, having finished in the top eight at the All-Japan Sumo Championship he was granted sandanme tsukedashi which allowed him to skip the lower divisions and start at sandanme 100. He won his debut basho with a 7–0 championship, he matched this performance the following tournament to win the makushita division. After two more winning tournaments he made his sekitori debut by being promoted to jūryō in November 2016.

Top division career
Following three successful tournaments in jūryō he was promoted to the top makuuchi division in May 2017. To mark the occasion he changed his shikona or fighting name from his own surname of Oyanagi to Yutakayama, a prestigious name at Tokitsukaze stable that had previously been used by the former ōzeki and head of the Japan Sumo Association Yutakayama Katsuo and former komusubi Yutakayama Hiromitsu. He could only manage four wins at the rank and was demoted back down to the second division for the next tournament. He managed a runner-up performance and was promoted back up the following tournament only to match his record for May 2017. After coming back to the makuuchi division for the third time he was finally able to get a winning record of 9–6 at maegashira 14 and followed that performance with a 10–5 at maegashira 11, which saw him promoted to the upper maegashira ranks for the first time, at maegashira 3. Fighting all the top ranked wrestlers for the first time he could manage only a 2–13 record, but in the following July tournament he produced his best performance to date, with a 12–3 runner up performance including a final day victory over the tournament winner Mitakeumi. He was awarded his first special prize, for Fighting Spirit. Promoted to maegashira 2 in September 2018, he withdrew from the tournament on Day 5 after sustaining an elbow injury in his Day 3 defeat to Kisenosato. He returned to the tournament on Day 9 and won three bouts out of his remaining seven matches for a 3–10–2 record. Three more losing records saw him demoted from makuuchi after the March 2019 tournament. He returned to the top division in September 2019 and four straight winning records saw him climb to maegashira 1 for the July 2020 tournament, his highest rank to date. However, he then had five straight losing records and was demoted back to jūryō for the May 2021 tournament.

Retirement
After the July 2021 tournament, Yutakayama reentered the top makuuchi division for the September 2021 tournament. However he quickly dropped in the rankings after a barely achieved winning score in September. For 2022, Yutakayama only achieved a winning record on the July tournament. In September, his 4-11 score sent him back to the jūryō division. After finishing the November tournament with a losing record, he announced his retirement from professional sumo.

Fighting style
Yutakayama is an oshi-sumo wrestler, who prefers thrusting and pushing at his opponents to fighting on the mawashi or belt. His most common winning kimarite is oshi-dashi, or push out.

Career record

See also
Glossary of sumo terms
List of past sumo wrestlers
List of sumo tournament top division runners-up
Active special prize winners

References

External links
 

1993 births
Living people
Japanese sumo wrestlers
Sumo people from Niigata Prefecture